Satish Pande is an Indian medical doctor, conservationist and researcher from Pune. He is an interventional radiologist at KEM Hospital, Pune. He also is the founder of the Ela Foundation, which works on nature education and conservation.  He is a Fellow of the Maharashtra Academy of Sciences and the Linnean Society of London, and has  published numerous studies on wild birds.

Works
Study of impact of wind farms on birds at the Bhambarwadi Plateau in the Northwestern Ghats

References

External links
Satish Pande at Google Scholar
Co nserving Mother Earth: Science and Hearts | Satish Pande | TEDxPICT
Haunting Hoots of Indian Owls: Ela Foundation Story with Dr. Satish Pande

Living people
Indian ornithologists
Scientists from Pune
Year of birth missing (living people)
Indian radiologists
Indian conservationists
Fellows of the Linnean Society of London